The Battle of Glendale, also known as the Battle of Frayser's Farm, Frazier's Farm, Nelson's Farm, Charles City Crossroads, New Market Road, or Riddell's Shop, took place on June 30, 1862, in Henrico County, Virginia, on the sixth day of the Seven Days Battles (Peninsula Campaign) of the American Civil War.

General Robert E. Lee ordered his Confederate divisions of the Army of Northern Virginia, under the field command of Major Generals Benjamin Huger, James Longstreet, and A.P. Hill, to converge upon Union Major General George B. McClellan's retreating Army of the Potomac in transit in the vicinity of Glendale (or Frayser's Farm), attempting to catch it in the flank and destroy it in detail. The Army of the Potomac was moving out of the White Oak Swamp on a retreat from the Chickahominy River to the James River following the perceived defeat at the Battle of Gaines' Mill; as the Union Army approached the Glendale crossroad, it was forced to turn southward with its right flank exposed to the west. Lee's goal was to thrust a multi-pronged attack of his divisions into the Army of the Potomac near the Glendale crossroad, where a vanguard of Union defenders was caught largely unaware.

The coordinated assault envisioned by Lee failed to materialize due to difficulties encountered by Huger and un-spirited efforts made by Major General Thomas J. "Stonewall" Jackson, but successful attacks made by Longstreet and Hill near the Glendale crossroad penetrated the Union defenses near Willis Church and temporarily breached the line. Union counterattacks sealed the breach and turned the Confederates back, repulsing their attack upon the line of retreat along the Willis Church/Quaker Road through brutal close-quarters hand-to-hand fighting. North of Glendale, Huger's advance was stopped on the Charles City Road. Near the White Oak Swamp Bridge, the divisions led by Jackson were simultaneously delayed by Union Brigadier General William B. Franklin's corps at White Oak Swamp. South of Glendale near Malvern Hill, Confederate Major General Theophilus H. Holmes made a feeble attempt to attack the Union left flank at Turkey Bridge but was driven back. 

The battle was Lee's best chance to cut off the Union Army from the safety of the James River, and his efforts to bisect the Federal line failed. The Army of the Potomac successfully retreated to the James, and that night, the Union army established a strong position on Malvern Hill.

Background

Military situation 

The Seven Days Battles began with a Union attack in the minor Battle of Oak Grove on June 25, 1862, but McClellan quickly lost the initiative as Lee began a series of attacks at Beaver Dam Creek (Mechanicsville) on June 26, Gaines' Mill on June 27, the minor actions at Garnett's and Golding's Farm on June 27 and June 28, and the attack on the Union rear guard at Savage's Station on June 29. McClellan's Army of the Potomac continued its retreat toward the safety of Harrison's Landing on the James River.

After Gaines' Mill, McClellan left his army with no clear instructions regarding routes of withdrawal and without naming a second-in-command. The bulk of the V Corps (less the Third Division), under Brigadier General Fitz John Porter, moved to occupy Malvern Hill, while the remaining four corps of the Army of the Potomac were essentially operating independently in their fighting withdrawal. Most elements of the army had been able to cross White Oak Swamp Creek by noon on June 30. About one third of the army had reached the James River, but the remainder was still marching between White Oak Swamp and Glendale. (Glendale was the name of a tiny community at the intersection of the Charles City, New Market/Long Bridge, and Quaker [or Willis Church] Roads, which led over Malvern Hill to the James River.) After inspecting the line of march that morning, McClellan rode south and boarded the ironclad USS Galena on the James River. 

Leaving the White Oak Swamp and traveling westward on the Long Bridge/New Market Road, the units of the Army of the Potomac made a 90-degree southward turn near the Glendale crossroad toward the James River, and this vulnerable junction was therefore a target of primary defensive importance. To protect the Army of the Potomac in transit, McClellan's corps commanders deployed divisions north-south in a defensive position along the Quaker Road and Charles City Road to protect against an eastward thrust by Lee's Army of North Virginia until the Army of the Potomac had arrived safely at Malvern Hill.

Lee ordered his Army of Northern Virginia to converge upon the retreating Union forces, bottlenecked on the inadequate road network. The Army of the Potomac, lacking overall command coherence, presented a discontinuous, ragged defensive line. Holmes was ordered to cannonade retreating Federals near Malvern Hill.

Opposing forces

Union

Confederate

Battle

As with most of the Seven Days Battles, Lee's elaborate plan was poorly executed by his field commanders. Huger was slowed by felled trees obstructing the Charles City Road, a result of the efforts of pioneers from Brigadier General Henry W. Slocum's division. Rather than clearing the path, Huger had his men spend hours chopping a new road through the thick woods in what became known as the "Battle of the Axes". He failed to take any alternative route, and, fearing a counterattack, failed to participate in the battle. By 4 p.m., Lee ordered Major General John B. Magruder to join Holmes on the River Road and attack Malvern Hill, the left flank of the Union line, then later ordered him to assist Longstreet; as a result, Magruder's division spent the day countermarching. Jackson moved slowly and spent the entire day north of the creek, making only feeble efforts to cross and attack Franklin's VI Corps in the Battle of White Oak Swamp, attempting to force the enemy back by a fruitless artillery duel so that a destroyed bridge could be rebuilt, despite the presence of adequate fords nearby. (In spite of his stunning victories in the recent Valley Campaign, or possibly due to battle fatigue from that campaign, Jackson's contributions to the Seven Days were marred by slow execution and poor judgment throughout.) Jackson's presence did cause two of Brigadier General John Sedgwick's three brigades, which had been defending the Charles City crossroads, to move north as reinforcements. 

At the same time, the Union Army near Glendale also stumbled in its initial deployment; on the evening of June 29, the Third Division of the V Corps, under command of Brigadier General George A. McCall, was ordered to take up a defensive position ahead of the Glendale intersection to head-off any Confederate thrust made in that direction. Moving slowly after dark on inadequate roads, the brigades of McCall's division became lost and overshot the crossroad, only realizing they had missed their objective sometime in the early morning hours of June 30. Backtracking toward Glendale, the division arrived near dawn, where it halted on its march to rejoin Porter, awaiting new orders. The gap in the Union line created by Sedgwick was noticed and plugged by McCall's three brigades after McCall and his brigadiers soon realized, to their genuine surprise, that nothing stood between them and the advancing divisions of Longstreet and Hill coming from the direction of Richmond. 

To the south, Holmes's inexperienced troops (from his Department of North Carolina, attached to the Army of Northern Virginia) made no progress against Porter at Turkey Bridge and Malvern Hill and were repulsed by artillery fire and by the Federal gunboats Galena and Aroostook on the James.

At 2 p.m., while Longstreet and Hill waited for the sounds of Huger's expected opening assault, Longstreet interpreted distant unidentified cannon fire as the signal to begin the coordinated attack. He opened upon McCall's line with his artillery, and McCall's artillery soon returned counter-battery fire.  Nearby, Lee, Longstreet, and visiting Confederate President Jefferson Davis were conferring on horseback when they came under heavy artillery fire (presumably blind fire from the Parrott rifles of McCall's Pennsylvania Artillery units), wounding two men and killing three horses. A. P. Hill, commanding in that sector, ordered the president and senior generals to the rear. Longstreet attempted to silence the batteries of Federal Parrott rifles firing in his direction, but long-range artillery fire proved to be inadequate to the task. He ordered Colonel Micah Jenkins to charge the batteries, soon followed by his other brigades mobilizing along the line, which brought about a general fight around 4 p.m.

Although belated and not initiated in the coordinated fashion as Lee planned, the combined assaults by the divisions of A. P. Hill and Longstreet (under Longstreet's overall command) would be the only units to follow Lee's order to attack the main Union concentration. Longstreet's 20,000 men were not joined by the Confederate divisions of Huger or Jackson, despite their concentration within a 3-mile (4.8 km) radius. Longstreet's troops assaulted the disjointed Union line of 40,000 men, arranged in a 2-mile (3.2 km) arc north and south of the Glendale intersection, but the brunt of the fighting centered on the position held by McCall's Pennsylvania Reserves division (Third Division of the V Corps), 6,000 men just west of Frayser's Farm and north of Willis Church. (Though the farm was now owned by R. H. Nelson, many locals still called it Frayser's Farm.) McCall's division consisted of three brigades:  Brigadier General George G. Meade's Second Brigade deployed on the right, Brigadier General Truman Seymour's Third Brigade deployed on the left, with the First Brigade of Brigadier General John F. Reynolds (presently commanded by Colonel Seneca G. Simmons following Reynolds's capture at Boatswain's Swamp after Gaines' Mill) held in reserve to the rear of center. Also attached to McCall's division of Pennsylvanian volunteer infantry regiments and two batteries of the 1st Pennsylvania Artillery were three units of artillery from the Colonel Henry Hunt's Army of the Potomac's Artillery Reserve: Captain Otto Diederich's Battery A, 1st Battalion, New York Light Artillery, Captain John Knieriem's Battery C, 1st Battalion, New York Light Artillery, and a Regular Army company, Lieutenant Alanson M. Randol's Battery E & G, 1st U.S. Artillery, replacing Captain Henry De Hart's Battery C, 5th U.S. Artillery which had been overrun at Gaines' Mill.

Incidentally, of all the units of the Army of the Potomac present on the Peninsula, McClellan and his corps commanders had tasked the critical defense of this Glendale crossroad to units of the V Corps, the only corps heavily engaged north of the Chickahominy at Gaines' Mill; in particular, to McCall's Pennsylvania Reserves, which had been disproportionately engaged and suffered approximately 2,000 casualties during the fighting at Beaver Dam Creek and Gaines' Mill, consequently entering the fighting at Glendale in a greatly diminished capacity. One historian of the Pennsylvania Reserves wrote of the division at Glendale, "Most of the men were fitter subjects for the hospital than for the battle-field."

Three Confederate brigades were sent forward in the assault, from north to south: Brigadier General Cadmus M. Wilcox, Colonel Micah Jenkins (Anderson's Brigade), and Brigadier General James L. Kemper. Longstreet ordered them forward in a piecemeal fashion over several hours, and they were greatly hindered additionally by the difficulty of the terrain and overgrown forest. The 14th Alabama Infantry was one of the first units to advance and bore the brunt of the Union fire, after which they were "nearly annihilated." The 14th Louisiana also suffered many casualties and would thereafter refer to the battle as "the Slaughterhouse." Kemper's Virginians charged through the thick woods first and emerged in front of five batteries of McCall's artillery. In their first combat experience, Kemper's brigade conducted a disorderly but enthusiastic assault on the Whitlock Farm, which carried them through Seymour's two 1st New York heavy Parrott batteries on McCall's extreme left flank. This sudden disturbance caused McCall to deploy his reserve brigade under Simmons from the center to the left to answer the charge, leaving his right flank weakened. (Colonel Simmons, commanding the counter-charge, was mortally wounded while driving Kemper back into the woods) Soon thereafter, the Confederates emerged opposite Meade's brigade and proceeded to break through the main line with Jenkins's support near the right center, followed up within a few hours by Wilcox's brigade of Alabamians in the center and right. 

During the course of the battle, fighting gradually shifted from McCall's left (Kemper's assault at the Whitlock Farm) through the center (Jenkins' initial probing assault on Captain James H. Cooper and Lieutenant Frank P. Amsden's 1st Pennsylvania Artillery batteries) and to his left (Jenkins'/Wilcox's combined assaults on Meade's brigade where McCall's Division met Kearny's in the New Market Road). The Confederate brigades met stiff resistance from Meade and Seymour in bitter hand-to-hand combat where men stabbed each other with bayonets and used rifles as clubs. Officers even took to using their typically ornamental swords as weapons. Jenkins' brigade briefly captured Captain James H. Cooper's six 10-pounder Parrott rifles, but were soon repulsed by the supporting infantrymen of the Pennsylvania Reserves.

Wilcox enjoyed the most successful assault near dusk, when half of his brigade (the 8th and 11th Alabama Infantry Regiments) emerged on McCall's right and found it exposed: to answer the earlier assault against McCall's center, Lieutenant Randol's Battery E & G, 1st U.S. Artillery had changed front to the left, facing his six 12-pounder Napoleon guns southward to rake Jenkins' regiments with devastating enfilading fire but exposing his own right flank to the west. When Wilcox's regiments emerged from the woods, Randol changed fire to the west once more, supported by Captain James Thompson's Battery G, 2nd U.S. Artillery of Kearny's Division to his right, but his supporting infantry units had shifted toward the center. After successfully repulsing with canister shot the first two Confederate infantry charges made upon the battery, Randol's infantry supports (either the 4th or 7th Pennsylvania Reserves) charged the retreating 8th Alabama to the front of the guns but met an unexpected fresh Confederate regiment, the 11th Alabama; they broke toward the rear and retreated through the battery, leading the 11th Alabama infantry right into the guns before they could fire in defense. Intense hand-to-hand fighting resulted around Randol's guns, observed by McCall and described by him as "one of the fiercest bayonet fights that perhaps ever occurred on this continent." Meade was severely wounded in the arm and back during the fighting while attempting to rally his men, and Colonel Elisha B. Harvey of the 7th Pennsylvania Reserve Regiment was gravely wounded when he was run down by a runaway caisson. Wilcox's regiments were driven away, but soon returned supported by Brigadier Generals Roger A. Pryor and Lawrence Branch before Randol's cannoneers could remove their six artillery pieces from the field.

McCall was captured when he mistakenly rode into the Confederate picket line after nightfall, looking for positions to place his rallied men. Seymour assumed command of the division. Generals Sumner and Heintzelman were both hit by stray bullets in the fighting; the former suffered no serious injury, but the latter was unable to use his right hand for a few weeks. Captain George Hazzard, commanding Battery A, 4th U.S. Artillery, was also mortally wounded.

On McCall's northern flank, the division of Brigadier General Philip Kearny held against repeated Confederate attacks with reinforcements of Caldwell's brigade and two brigades from Slocum's division. On the southern flank, Brigadier General Joseph Hooker's division repelled and once pursued minor attacks. Sedgwick's division, whose brigades had returned from near White Oak Swamp, came up to fill a gap after a brutal counterattack. Heavy fighting continued until about 8:30 p.m. Longstreet committed virtually every brigade in the divisions under his command, while on the Union side they had been fed in individually to plug holes in the line as they occurred.

Aftermath
The battle was tactically inconclusive, although Lee failed to achieve his objective of preventing the Federal escape and crippling McClellan's army, if not destroying it. Longstreet's performance had been poor, sending in brigade after brigade in a piecemeal fashion, rather than striking with concentrated force in the manner for which he would be known later in the war. He also was not supported by Huger and Jackson, as Lee had planned. Instead of attacking, both generals merely kept their divisions on the north side of White Oak Swamp and launched no action other than an occasional artillery exchange. Union casualties were 3,797 (297 killed, 1,696 wounded, and 1,804 missing or captured). Confederate casualties were comparable in total—3,673 (638 killed, 2,814 wounded, and 221 missing)—but more than 40% higher in killed and wounded. Longstreet lost more than a quarter of his division. Union Generals Meade, Heintzelman, Sumner and Confederate Generals Joseph R. Anderson, Dorsey Pender, and Winfield S. Featherston were wounded.

On the evening of June 30, McClellan, who had witnessed none of the fighting, wired the War Department: "My Army has behaved superbly and have done all that men could do. If none of us escape we shall at least have done honor to the country. I shall do my best to save the Army." He later requested 50,000 reinforcements (which the War Department had no chance of providing). "With them, I will retrieve our fortunes." McClellan has received significant criticism from historians about his detachment from the battle, sailing on the Galena out of touch while his men fought. 

Ethan Rafuse wrote that after McClellan supervised the deployment of three corps near the Glendale crossroads, what he did next "almost defies belief. ... Even though his men were at the time engaged in a fierce battle near Glendale ... he spent the afternoon on board the Galena, dining with [Captain] Rodgers and traveling briefly up river to watch the gunboat shelling of a Confederate division that had been spotted marching east along the River road toward Malvern Hill." 

Brian K. Burton wrote, "more than on any other day, McClellan's judgment on [June 30, 1862] is suspect. He had arranged for signal communications between Malvern Hill and the river but that is a poor substitute. To leave units from five different corps at a vital point with no overall commander is to court disaster." 

Stephen W. Sears wrote that, when McClellan deserted his army on the Glendale and Malvern Hill battlefields during the Seven Days, "he was guilty of dereliction of duty."

After the battle, Lee wrote, "Could the other commands have cooperated in this action, the result would have proved most disastrous to the enemy." 

Confederate Major General D.H. Hill was even more direct: "Had all our troops been at Frayser's Farm, there would have been no Malvern Hill." 

After the war, Confederate Brigadier General Edward Porter Alexander (present at Glendale) wrote, "Never, before or after, did the fates put such a prize within our reach. It is my individual belief that on two occasions in the four years, we were within reach of military successes so great that we might have hoped to end the war with our independence. ... The first was at Bull Run [in] July 1861 ... This [second] chance of June 30, 1862 impresses me as the best of all."

Lee would have only one more opportunity to intercept McClellan's army before it reached the safety of the river and the end of the Seven Days, at the Battle of Malvern Hill on July 1.

Part of the battle took place on Gravel Hill, a community established for slaves freed by Quaker Robert Pleasants before 1800. Although what had once been the historic Gravel Hill School had been destroyed, it was replaced by Gravel Hill Baptist Church in 1866, and the community remains close-knit today.

Battlefield preservation

The American Battlefield Trust and its partners have acquired and preserved  of the battlefield in more than 15 separate acquisitions from 1995 through November 2021.

See also 

 Troop engagements of the American Civil War, 1862
 List of costliest American Civil War land battles
 Richmond in the Civil War
 Virginia in the American Civil War
 List of American Civil War battles
 List of Virginia Civil War units

Notes

References
 Alexander, Edward P. Fighting for the Confederacy: The Personal Recollections of General Edward Porter Alexander. Edited by Gary W. Gallagher. Chapel Hill: University of North Carolina Press, 1989. .
 Burton, Brian K. Extraordinary Circumstances: The Seven Days Battles. Bloomington: Indiana University Press, 2001. .
 Eicher, David J. The Longest Night: A Military History of the Civil War. New York: Simon & Schuster, 2001. .
 Esposito, Vincent J. West Point Atlas of American Wars. New York: Frederick A. Praeger, 1959. .
 Kennedy, Frances H., ed. The Civil War Battlefield Guide. 2nd ed. Boston: Houghton Mifflin Co., 1998. .
Longstreet, James. From Manassas to Appomattox: Memoirs of the Civil War in America. New York: J.B. Lippincott & Co., 1895. 
Meade, George Gordon, Jr., ed. The Life and Letters of George Gordon Meade, vol 1. New York: Charles Scribner’s Sons, 1913.
 Rafuse, Ethan S. McClellan's War: The Failure of Moderation in the Struggle for the Union. Bloomington: Indiana University Press, 2005. .
 Salmon, John S. The Official Virginia Civil War Battlefield Guide. Mechanicsburg, PA: Stackpole Books, 2001. .
 Sears, Stephen W. Controversies & Commanders: Dispatches from the Army of the Potomac. Boston: Houghton Mifflin Co., 1999. .
 Sears, Stephen W. George B. McClellan: The Young Napoleon. New York: Da Capo Press, 1988. .
 Sears, Stephen W. To the Gates of Richmond: The Peninsula Campaign. New York: Ticknor and Fields, 1992. .
 War of the Rebellion: A Compilation of the Official Records of the Union and Confederate Armies. Series 1, Vol. 11, Part 2. Washington, D.C.: G.P.O., 1884.
 Reports of Brigadier General Joseph Hooker (No. 36)     
Report of Captain James Thompson (No. 64)
Reports of Lieutenant A.M. Randol (No. 102)
 Reports of Brigadier General George A. McCall (No. 154)
 Report of Brigadier General Truman Seymour (No. 155)
Report of Colonel Albert L. Magilton (No. 163)
Report of Major General James Longstreet (No. 300)
Report of Brigadier General James L. Kemper (No. 302)
Reports of Brigadier General Cadmus M. Wilcox (No. 304)
 Report of Major General Theophilus H. Holmes (No. 352)
 Welcher, Frank J. The Union Army, 1861–1865 Organization and Operations. Vol. 1, The Eastern Theater. Bloomington: Indiana University Press, 1989. .
 Wert, Jeffry D. The Sword of Lincoln: The Army of the Potomac. New York: Simon & Schuster, 2005. .
National Park Service battle description
 CWSAC Report Update

Further reading
 Crenshaw, Douglas. The Battle of Glendale: Robert E. Lee's Lost Opportunity. Charleston, SC: The History Press, 2017. .
"Stirring the Blood of Friend and Foe to Admiration": Lieutenant Alanson Randol’s Battery E & G, 1st U.S. Artillery at the Battle of Glendale, June 30, 1862 Article and bibliography.

External links
 Battle of Glendale: Maps, histories, photos, and preservation news (Civil War Trust)
Battle of Glendale in Encyclopedia Virginia
 Animated history of the Peninsula Campaign

Glendale
Glendale
Glendale
Glendale
Glendale
1862 in the American Civil War
1862 in Virginia
June 1862 events